Vladimir Romanovich Alekno (born in Polotsk on 4 December 1966) is a former Russian volleyball player and current volleyball coach.  

Alekno's volleyball career started in 1984 in the SKA Minsk. Alekno coached the Russian national volleyball team in 2007-2008 and 2011-2012. Under his leadership, the Russian players won the gold medal in 2012 and the bronze medal in 2008 in the Summer Olympic Games. Also, they won the World League and the World Cup, both times in 2011.

In 2020, Alekno was announced head coach of the Iran national volleyball team.

Early life 
Alekno was born on 4 December 1966, in Polotsk, Vitebsk Voblast, BSSR to a Belarusian mother and a Lithuanian father.

Awards

Individual
 2013 Order of Honour
 2019 Order of Friendship

References 

1966 births
Living people
Russian men's volleyball players
Russian volleyball coaches
People from Polotsk
Coaches of Russia men's national volleyball team
Honoured Coaches of Russia
Members of the Civic Chamber of the Russian Federation
Russian State University of Physical Education, Sport, Youth and Tourism alumni